Birthplace of Adlai E. Stevenson II is a Los Angeles Historic-Cultural Monument (No. 35) in the West Adams neighborhood of Los Angeles, California. The site was the birthplace of two-time US Presidential candidate Adlai E. Stevenson II, who was born there on February 5, 1900. The house was designed by C.W. Wedgewood and built in approximately 1894. When Stevenson died in 1965, the site was declared a Historic-Cultural Monument.

See also
 List of Los Angeles Historic-Cultural Monuments in South Los Angeles

References

External links
 Big Orange Landmarks article on Adlai Stevenson Birthplace

Houses in Los Angeles
Houses completed in 1894
Los Angeles Historic-Cultural Monuments
Victorian architecture in California
West Adams, Los Angeles
Stevenson, Adlai E II